Astartea corniculata is a shrub endemic to Western Australia.

Description
The open diffuse shrub, which typically grows to a height of 3 meters (9.8 ft), blooms between October and May, producing white-pink flowers, and can thrive in a variety of growing locations, including sandy peat, black sandy clay, and humus-rich soils, as well as quartz sand. It is also versatile in terms of its placement, growing well in flats, slopes, valleys, edges of creeks, swamps and wetlands, and flood plains.

Ecology
It is found along the south coast on flats, slopes, river banks, swamps, wetlands and flood plains in the Great Southern region of Western Australia where it grows in sandy-peaty-clay soils.

References

Eudicots of Western Australia
corniculata
Endemic flora of Western Australia
Plants described in 1844